Albert Street Uniting Church is a heritage-listed church at 319 Albert Street (on the corner of Ann Street), Brisbane City, City of Brisbane, Queensland, Australia. It was designed by George Henry Male Addison and built from 1888 to 1889 by Thomas Pearson & Sons. It was originally known as Albert Street Methodist Church and Central Methodist Mission. It was added to the Queensland Heritage Register on 21 October 1992.

History 

The first Methodist church in Brisbane, a modest brick chapel, was constructed in 1849 on the corner of Albert Street and Burnett Lane. It was replaced in 1856 by a larger building. By the early 1880s the congregation had grown substantially and in 1884 purchased a site on the corner of Albert and Ann Streets. A competition was held for the design of a new church which was won by G H M Addison.

Other tradespeople included Petrie & Son (joinery), and Exton and Gough (stained glass windows). In keeping with the importance placed on music in Methodism, a large pipe organ was installed. Five foundation stones were laid by prominent congregation members on 18 August 1888 and the church was officially opened on 8 November 1889.

In the 1920s, a marble honour board was erected in the front entrance vestibule commemorating the members of the congregation who served in World War I. Additional stained glass windows were installed as memorials in 1944 and 1947. Restoration work was undertaken in 1974-75 and involved the replacement of the slate roof. Further repair work on the building has been undertaken over the years.

In 1907, the church became known as the Central Methodist Mission in recognition of its wider responsibilities as the main Methodist church in the city. The congregation has been involved in a variety of welfare activities and has developed an extensive network of accommodation and other services for aged people.

On Thursday 1 March 1928,  John Gladwell Wheen, the President-General of the Methodist Church of Australasia unveiled a memorial tablet for Henry Youngman in the church.

The church served as the symbolic centre of Methodism in Queensland. The Annual Conference was opened each year in the church and significant occasions for Methodists were celebrated there. With the formation of the Uniting Church in 1977, the church was renamed Albert Street Uniting Church.

Description 

Albert Street Uniting Church is built of red brick with trimmings in white Oamaru limestone, now painted, and has a slate roof. It is an example of a Victorian Gothic Revival church with its cruciform plan shape, steeply pitched roof forms, the imposing spire beside the entry, and the heavy buttressing of the facades.

The entry to the church is from an open porch with three Gothic arches at the end of the nave. Similar arcades exist down the sides of the church. A single large Gothic opening with fine tracery is located above the entry porch. To the right of the entry is a tower rising to the octagonal spire which has tall dormers on four of its faces and four pinnacles at the corners of its base. The top of the spire has a wrought iron finial.

The roof on the nave also has small dormer ventilators. A side entry is to the right of the base of the tower and has a broad Gothic arch with a steeply pitched parapet topped by a Christian cross. The end of each transept has a rose window in the gable end above a pair of Gothic arched windows that in turn are above groups of smaller openings.

Internally, the nave floor slopes down towards the pulpit and the walls are rendered, with a timber boarded dado. The galleries contain tiered seating and are supported on cast iron columns with ornate capitals. The main ceiling and gallery soffits are diagonally boarded and finely carved timberwork is incorporated into the gallery railings, roof structure and furnishings.

The focus of the interior is the pulpit and organ. The pulpit is raised several metres above the floor, and reflects the importance in the Methodist tradition that was given to preaching. Above and behind the pulpit is a large decoratively painted pipe organ which reflects the value placed by Methodists on music and singing.

Heritage listing 
Albert Street Uniting Church was listed on the Queensland Heritage Register on 21 October 1992 having satisfied the following criteria.

Demonstrating the evolution or pattern of Queensland's history.
 As an excellent example of a Victorian Gothic Revival church, climatically adapted with side colonnades and front porch; and internally a good example of the major attributes of the Methodist tradition.
 For its association with the Methodist Church in Queensland
 As a dominant element on the corner of Albert and Ann Streets, and for its contribution to the townscape at King George Square
 As one of the major works of the architect G H M Addison.

Demonstrating the principal characteristics of a particular class of cultural places.
 The church is an excellent example of a Victorian Gothic Revival church, climatically adapted with side colonnades and front porch; and internally a good example of the major attributes of the Methodist tradition.
 As one of the major works of the architect G H M Addison.

Aesthetic significance.
 As a dominant element on the corner of Albert and Ann Streets, and for its contribution to the townscape at King George Square.

Strong or special association with a particular community or cultural group for social, cultural or spiritual reasons.
 For its association with the Methodist Church in Queensland.

See also 

 Albert Hall

References

Attribution

External links

 Albert Street Uniting Church web site

Queensland Heritage Register
Churches in Brisbane
History of Brisbane
GHM Addison buildings
Churches completed in 1889
Gothic Revival church buildings in Australia
Albert Street, Brisbane
Ann Street, Brisbane
Articles incorporating text from the Queensland Heritage Register
Uniting churches in Brisbane
Methodist churches in Queensland